Cloud Elements is a cloud API integration platform that enables developers to publish, integrate, aggregate and manage all of their APIs through a unified platform. Using Cloud Elements, developers can quickly connect entire categories of cloud services (e.g., CRM, documents, finance) using uniform APIs or simply synchronize data between multiple cloud services (e.g. Salesforce, Zendesk and Quickbooks) using its innovative integration toolkit.

Founded in October 2012, Cloud Elements is purpose-built for developers to help organize their world of APIs through a one-to-many approach. Cloud Elements is headquartered in Denver, Colorado, but serves customers worldwide.

Cloud Elements accelerates API Integrations through an innovative API Hub technology providing uniform APIs that developers use to easily make APIs work together. Developers have published millions of unique APIs, each one its own island of data, with the bigger challenge now being to integrate APIs together in order to synchronize data and build new apps faster.

Cloud Elements was acquired by UiPath in March 2021.

History 
In October 2012, Cloud Elements was founded by CEO Mark Geene, CTO Vineet Joshi, and VP of Product Development Atul Barve. The three shared a vision to "help developers build cloud applications faster and at a lower cost..." Since the start of the company, Cloud Elements has grown to over 100 employees who work together to bring API Integrations to all business sizes.

On July 18, 2014, the company announced receiving US$3.1 million in a Series A funding round. Investors include Virginia-based Grotech Ventures, California-based Icon Venture Partners, along with Galvanize Ventures.

On January 9, 2017, the company announced receiving $13M in funding to reach Series B. The funding was led by Harbert Growth Partners to allow Cloud Elements to continue their revenue increase of nearly 40% quarter-over-quarter.

During SAPPHIRE NOW 2018, SAP launched SAP Cloud Platform Open Connectors, a purpose built API integration platform leveraging the Cloud Elements catalog of feature-rich connectors to over 150 leading enterprise SaaS applications.

In March 2021, robotic process automation company UiPath acquired Cloud Elements to advance API-based automation in the enterprise.

Technology 
Cloud Elements was created to offer cloud applications or "hubs" that provide RESTful APIs with JSON payloads. Cloud Elements "differentiates itself with its one-to-many API which lets developers integrate and maintain several services or "elements" in a category." Within the hubs, each connector or “Elements” provide a variety of advanced features built-in.

Cloud Elements’ API integration platform puts the data at the centre of the customer company's application ecosystem. They provide a virtual data hub that puts a data model at the centre of the integration strategy, making it easier to manage and integrate the data. Additionally, Cloud Elements provides normalized and consistent APIs across their entire catalogue of Elements, to eliminate the need for experts for every endpoint. Finally, the platform allows for the service to be embedded into an app for customers convenience.

Virtual Data Resource 
Virtual Data Resources (VDR) provide a canonicalized view of data objects while eliminating the need for point-to-point mapping of data to each and every new application. Putting data models at the centre of the application ecosystem enables the management of the company's data. The enriched API models are maintained by Cloud Elements to make it easier to map from defined resources, to the required endpoints.

Traditional integration platforms are point-to-point, meaning each new application needs to be connected directly to every other application in the ecosystem. Point-to-point integration is not the best solution for external integration embedded in a platform and makes it difficult to scale. To effectively use CE's VDR, they created a UI that easily maps a domain model to the cloud services in use or they allow you to directly write to the integrations. They also offer VDR templates, which are pre-written templates of the more common resources used by their customers, by pre-mapping them to multiple endpoints.

Recognition 
Outside Magazines "Best Places to Work" (2015, 2017)
 Winner of CTA's Top Technology Startup of the Year (2013)
 Winner of Built in Colorado Top 100 Digital Companies
 APEX Technology Startup of the Year (2013)
 Lead 411 Winner Hottest Company Award Colorado
 Featured in Ovum's 'On the Radar' Report (December 2013)

See also 
 Enterprise application integration
 Integration platform
 Comparison of business integration software

References

External links 
 
 
 
 
 

American companies established in 2012
Cloud computing providers
Companies based in Denver
2021 mergers and acquisitions